Hartvig Hansen Jentoft (1693 – 1 December 1739) was a Norwegian tradesman and sailor.

Jentoft was born in the village of Borg on the island of Vestvågøya in Nordland. He was the son of Hans Hansen Jentoft (d. 1718) and Ingeborg Hartvigsdatter (d. by 1734). His father was the residing chaplain at Borge Church where his uncle Arent Hartvigsen was parish priest. Jentoft joined Hans Egede on his Greenland expedition in 1721. Jentoft worked as merchant for the Bergen Greenland Company 
(Det Bergen Grønlandske Compagnie) on Nipisat Island at the first Danish/Norwegian colony until  the fall of 1725.  Jentoft later settled at Buksnes in Lofoten. He lived there as a skipper, sailor and landlord. In 1727, he was married  to Maren Røst  (d. 1737) and after her death  with Karen Schøning (d. 1755).  He perished at sea in 1739.

References

1693 births
1739 deaths
People from Vestvågøy
Norwegian merchants
Norwegian sailors
People who died at sea
18th-century Norwegian businesspeople
Norwegian landlords
18th-century landowners